Rapunzel is a fictional character who appears in Walt Disney Animation Studios' 50th animated feature film Tangled (2010). Voiced by American actress and singer Mandy Moore, Rapunzel is a young princess kept unaware of her royal heritage by a vain old woman named Mother Gothel, who raises her in a secluded tower to exploit her hair's healing abilities to remain young and beautiful forever.

Created and animated by supervising animator Glen Keane, Rapunzel is loosely based on the title character of the fairy tale of the same name published by the Brothers Grimm. The character was adapted into a less passive heroine for the film.

Critical reception of Rapunzel has been generally positive, with critics complimenting her spirited, lively personality and independence. The tenth Disney Princess, Rapunzel was officially inducted into the line-up on October 2, 2011, becoming the franchise's first computer-animated member and the first European princess in 20 years, the last being Belle from Beauty and the Beast (1991). Her appearance and personality have drawn much comparison between her and one of the preceding Disney Princesses, Ariel from The Little Mermaid (1989), by whom she was inspired.

Development

Conception and writing
Longtime Disney animator Glen Keane first decided to adapt the fairy tale "Rapunzel" by the Brothers Grimm into an animated feature film in 1996. Keane became interested in the idea of directing an animated film based on "Rapunzel" because he was especially intrigued by the concept of a "person that was born with this gift inside of her and it had to come out", which he felt was similar to his experience working as an animator at Walt Disney Animation Studios. Keane eventually resigned from his position as director after suffering a heart attack in 2008, and Nathan Greno and Byron Howard were hired to replace him. However, Keane remained closely involved with the project nonetheless, serving as both the film's executive producer and Rapunzel's supervising animator.

Walt Disney first attempted to adapt "Rapunzel" into an animated film soon after the studio released Snow White and the Seven Dwarfs in 1937, but the project was ultimately abandoned when the story turned out to be "a really hard nut to crack". According to Keane, this was mainly due to the fact that the majority of the fairy tale takes place within a tower. To overcome this, Tangled's writers were forced to develop a way of "bringing Rapunzel out of the tower". Originally, the film was conceived under the title Rapunzel Unbraided, which Keane described as "a Shrek-like version of the film" that revolved around an entirely different concept. Keane said of the original plot, "It was a fun, wonderful, witty version and we had a couple of great writers. But in my heart of hearts I believed there was something much more sincere and genuine to get out of the story, so we set it aside and went back to the roots of the original fairy tale."

An interview with actress Kristin Chenoweth, who was originally cast as Rapunzel, reveals that at some point Rapunzel was intended to be a squirrel. As directors, Greno and Howard felt it essential that Rapunzel resemble a less "passive" heroine than the way she is depicted in the original fairy tale. "We knew we were making this movie for a contemporary audience and we wanted Rapunzel to be a real role model in a way. We wanted all this girl power and to really drive this story, so she doesn't wait around for anything ... she's a smart girl, she has these hopes and dreams and she's going to get what she wants out of life." Tangled's production was surrounded by rumors that it would be Disney's last princess film.

Voice

In 2004, actress and singer Kristin Chenoweth was originally cast as the voice of Rapunzel while the film was still titled Rapunzel Unbraided under Keane's direction. Chenoweth, who had already begun recording dialogue for the role, said of her character at the time, "I am Rapunzel, but Rapunzel is a squirrel ... and I'm going to let down my tail." At one point, Disney had been considering casting actress Reese Witherspoon as Rapunzel. Some media outlets reported that Chenoweth and Witherspoon would actually be sharing the title role, while The Guardian reported that Witherspoon would actually be voicing "a modern girl who gate-crashes Rapunzel's fairytale world." Additionally, Witherspoon was also intended to serve as an executive producer on the film, a position the studio had offered to her hoping this would convince the actress to accept the role. However, Witherspoon eventually exited the project due to alleged creative differences in regards to suggestions towards the film's script, claiming the project is "no longer the film that Reese had originally signed on to do." Following Witherspoon's resignation, Rapunzel remained uncast for quite some time, further jeopardizing the film's already troubled production, a period during which the character's voice was temporarily provided by "friends around the studio" in lieu of legitimate actresses.

The filmmakers opted not to hire A-list celebrities to voice the film's main characters. Afterwards, the directors continued to audition hundreds of young actresses in the hopes of finding Rapunzel's voice, among them Broadway performer Idina Menzel, but none sounded quite right until they finally discovered singer and actress Mandy Moore. Describing the opportunity to voice a Disney character as "the ultimate fantasy", Moore was a long-time fan of Disney films. Initially, knowledge that the role was being heavily sought after at the time deterred her from auditioning in favor of avoiding disappointment. Once she made up her mind to audition, Moore "chased after" the role, auditioning for it twice. Because the film is a musical requiring its cast to provide both their characters' speaking and singing voices, all candidates were asked to perform one song of their choice in the style of a singer-songwriter; Moore, a professional singer herself, auditioned with Joni Mitchell's "Help Me". Child actress Delaney Rose Stein was eventually cast as a young version Rapunzel. According to co-director Byron Howard, Moore "has this great soul to her voice" as well as "this down-to-earth, girl-next-door quality that makes her everything you could hope for in a Disney heroine."

Upon joining the cast of Tangled, Moore was initially unaware that the film was slated to be Walt Disney Animation Studios' 50th animated feature film. Since that time, she has received her ignorance with gratitude, explaining, "I feel lucky because I would've probably felt a bit more pressure had I known going into the recording process." Moore hardly worked with co-stars Zachary Levi and Donna Murphy, who provided the voices of Flynn Rider and Mother Gothel, respectively, never meeting Murphy and having only met Levi once to record their characters' duet  "I See the Light". Moore was surprised to learn that she would be isolated from her co-stars against initial expectations that "we're all going to be chummy, hanging out at the studio laughing and going out to dinner together". Moore had little idea of what her character looked like because, in terms of visual aid, she was only provided with rough, incomplete sketches and storyboards, while "everything else had to be explained" by Howard and Greno. The majority of the images were created by Moore herself in her own mind.

Moore described the recording process as challenging because she was provided with little visual aid, explaining, "All I had to work off were a few sketches ... but it was also fun because it allows you to go into the depths of your imagination." She also revealed that creating Rapunzel's voice was simply a process of "let[ting] go". Moore was often required to re-record a single line a total of four times before the directors finally heard a version with which they were satisfied. After watching the completed film for the first time, Moore was disappointed with her own performance because she felt that her voice sounded "shrill". According to composer Alan Menken, Moore's musical background made her "a delight to work with". Moore found the practice of performing in character challenging in comparison to recording her own original music, explaining, "I can't just be like Mandy and sing something the way that I want to necessarily, because you know, you sort of have to stick to certain guidelines." She found recording "When Will My Life Begin" particularly difficult due to the speed at which she had to say certain words, and cites both Menken and discovering Rapunzel herself as a character with guiding her through the process.

Personality and design 

Executive producer John Lasseter explained that "The challenge is that you want to make Rapunzel feel like a smart, clever, educated, healthy, fun human being" despite the fact that the character has not ventured outside of her tower in 18 years. According to The New York Times, Rapunzel's personality made her a significant departure from traditional Disney heroines. Mandy Moore believes that Rapunzel is an atypical Disney princess because she is an independent character who "can take care of herself", in addition to being largely oblivious to the fact that she is a princess. Moore also described Rapunzel as "the bohemian Disney princess" and "a Renaissance woman".

Supervising animator Glen Keane designed Rapunzel under the tutelage of veteran animator Ollie Johnston, one of Disney's Nine Old Men. Johnston advised Keane to attempt to capture what Rapunzel is thinking as opposed to simply animating what the character is doing after reviewing one of his early pencil tests. Keane compared receiving this advice to receiving a "slap that I never forgot, so when I was drawing over people's work, I really tried to get into the head of the thinking of the character". Co-director Byron Howard was inspired by the appearance of Ariel from Disney's The Little Mermaid (1989), a character who was also animated by Keane. Howard elaborated that "Ariel was the first character that I ever thought there was a soul behind her eyes ... We hoped to do that with Rapunzel to find some sort of soul and depth that people could relate to". Meanwhile, Keane observed that Ariel and Rapunzel also share "irrepressible" spirits while encountering barriers that prevent them from pursuing their dreams. Keane was inspired by a book about the idea of feminine beauty; the book cited "strangeness" as "the key to beauty ... in a woman's face." Taking this into consideration, Keane maintained a sense of asymmetry while drawing Rapunzel, incorporating into her face several subtle imperfections, specifically her bucked teeth. The character was also drawn with freckles, making her the first Disney princess to have this feature. Keane designed Rapunzel with large eyes to convey her "irrepressible quality", a trait her also discovered in Mandy Moore's voice. Rapunzel is depicted as a barefooter, and Moore was barefoot herself while recording her lines. Although Moore has observed some physical similarities between the character and herself, she maintains that Rapunzel's appearance was developed long before she became involved with the project, dismissing any similarities as "coincidental".

Keane is known for basing his characters on members of his family; Rapunzel's passion for art and painting was inspired by the interests of his daughter, Claire. Several of Claire's original drawings and paintings are used to decorate Rapunzel's tower. While Keane working on Tangled, Claire gave birth to his first grandchild, Matisse, whose appearance served as the animator's inspiration for the infant Rapunzel.

Hair

Rapunzel was the first blonde Disney animated heroine since Aurora in Sleeping Beauty (1959). Animating Rapunzel's hair using computer-generated imagery has been regarded as the most challenging aspect in the development process of Tangled. According to the Los Angeles Times, supervising animator Glen Keane has become well known for animating some of Walt Disney Animation Studios' "greatest hair hits" since 1989, including Ariel from The Little Mermaid, the Beast from Beauty and the Beast (1991) and Pocahontas from Pocahontas (1995). Both Keane and Howard have expressed similar opinions on Rapunzel's hair, with Keane describing it as "this constant reminder that she has this gift". As directors, Howard and Greno provided the animators with much live-action material and reference to use as inspiration for the appearance of Rapunzel's hair, such as attaching long strands of string to a baseball cap that they would take turns wearing in the studio and moving around it. Additionally, they recruited women who had not cut their hair in several years to serve as live models.

Senior Software Engineer Dr. Kelly Ward, a hair simulation major and graduate from the University of North Carolina, was placed in charge of developing special software meant to assist the animators in animating 70 to 75 feet of hair. Ward revealed that, in real life, the character's hair would weigh roughly 60 pounds, "more weight than a real person would be able to move around as effortlessly as we allow Rapunzel to do in the movie". For simplicity sake, the animators reduced the realistic total of 100,000 individual strands of hair found on a typical human head to a more manageable 100 for Rapunzel. Acquiring the unique but realistic shade of golden blonde for Rapunzel's hair also proved challenging to the animators.

Appearances

Film and television

Tangled (2010) 
Rapunzel first appears in Tangled as an infant princess who is born to a queen. Having inherited the healing abilities of a magical flower the ailing queen ingested while pregnant, the princess is kidnapped by a vain old woman named Mother Gothel, who uses her hair to remain young and beautiful. Gothel raises the princess in an isolated tower, from which Rapunzel sees the release of thousands of floating lanterns, unaware that these lanterns are actually the kingdom's way of remembering her. As her eighteenth birthday arrives, Rapunzel grows increasingly eager to leave the tower and see the floating lanterns, and blackmails a wanted thief named Flynn Rider to take her there in her mother's absence. However, Gothel soon learns of Rapunzel's disobedience and pursues them, hiring a pair of thieves to incapacitate Flynn.

Rapunzel and Flynn eventually arrive at the kingdom in time for the lantern ceremony. Soon afterwards, Flynn is ambushed and turned in to the police by his former partners-in-crime the Stabbington brothers, whom he abandoned in an attempt to outrun the king's soldiers, and is sentenced to death. However, before the Brothers can harm Rapunzel, Gothel knocks them unconscious and takes a heartbroken Rapunzel back to the tower.

Back in her bedroom, Rapunzel suddenly regains subconscious memories of her true identity and rebels against Gothel. However, Gothel, unwilling to lose Rapunzel, traps her. When Flynn escapes and arrives at the tower to save Rapunzel, Gothel stabs him. Desperate to save him, Rapunzel promises to do whatever Gothel pleases in return. Gothel complies, but just before Rapunzel can heal him, Flynn cuts her hair short with a mirror shard, causing it to turn brown and lose all of its magical powers, resulting in Gothel's death. Flynn dies in Rapunzel's arms, but the flower's magic manifests itself through Rapunzel's tears and returns Flynn to life. Flynn returns Rapunzel to the palace, where she is finally reunited with her parents.

At the end of the film, Flynn accepts his birth name, Eugene Fitzherbert, and reveals that he has proposed to Rapunzel.

Tangled: Ever After (2012)
In this 6-minute short film, the entire kingdom is preparing for Rapunzel's marriage to Eugene. Several guests are in attendance, including Rapunzel's birth parents, the King and Queen, the pub thugs and the Stabbington Brothers, while their animal friends Pascal, a chameleon, and Maximus, a horse, serve as the Flower boy and ring bearer respectively. Just as a brown-haired Rapunzel, accompanied by her father, completes her journey down the aisle to unite with Eugene, Maximus, who is carrying the wedding rings on a pillow in his mouth, has a reaction to one of Pascal's flower petals and sneezes, expelling the rings down the aisle and out onto the city streets.

Desperate to retrieve them, Pascal and Maximus sneak out of the chapel while Rapunzel and Eugene say their wedding vows.  After pursuing the rings on tumultuous chase around the kingdom and encountering several obstacles along the way, they finally manage to recover them from a flock of flying doves, crashing into a tar factory in the process. Pascal and Maximus return to the chapel just as the bishop asks for the rings. Though shocked by their tar-covered appearance, Rapunzel and Eugene exchange rings nonetheless and share a kiss. Exhausted from their previous endeavors, Maximus sits down, nudging the wedding cake in the process and causing it, which has been positioned on wheels, to roll down the aisle.

Frozen (2013) 
Rapunzel and Eugene have a cameo appearance on Elsa's coronation day. Rapunzel is shown at the front gates grand opening as Anna runs out singing "For the First Time in Forever".

Sofia the First: The Curse of Princess Ivy (2014) 
Called upon by the Amulet of Avalor, Rapunzel rescues Princess Sofia and Princess Amber from a crevice by letting them climb her 70 foot long blonde hair. Flying back to Enchancia on one of the dragons, she teaches Amber about the consequences of her actions toward Sofia, in the form of a song, "Risk It All" and refers to Eugene it in. She then gives Amber one final piece of advice: "If you truly love your sister, you'll know what to do when the time comes" and vanishes back to Corona. Mandy Moore reprises her role from the film as well.

Tangled: Before Ever After (2017) 
Rapunzel is adjusting to her new life as princess of Corona six months after the events of Tangled. Rapunzel's coronation is set to happen in a few days. Her father restricts her freedom, prepared to not lose his daughter once more. In the middle of all this stress, on the night of the royal banquet, Eugene publicly proposes to Rapunzel, but she rejects it, feeling she is not sure if she is interested to stay at the palace after marriage and that she needs to sort out her life first. On that night, she is sneaked out from the kingdom by her lady-in-waiting, Cassandra, so that she can get her mind off her problems. When Cassandra shows her the place where the mystical golden flower that saved her mother and herself was found, she touches one of the mystical rock spikes that started to sprout around a year ago, causing her  70 feet long blonde hair to grow back, and possessing new abilities. The story continues as she is confronted by a known enemy of the kingdom on her coronation day, and is forbidden to leave the walls of Corona without her father's consent. In her bedchamber, Rapunzel is determined to fill her journal with her own adventures, and solve the mystery of her hair's miraculous return.

Rapunzel's Tangled Adventure (2017–2020) 
Rapunzel appears in the animated television series. Most of the first season is set on her uncovering the mystery of her new hair and its connection to the mystical rock spikes she had discovered several weeks ago, with the help of her lady-in-waiting Cassandra (who later turns out to be Mother Gothel's daughter), and a young scientist named Varian. In addition, she tries her best on how to be a good princess and future queen of Corona, even though her naive and gullible ways often get her into trouble.

Ralph Breaks the Internet (2018 film)
Rapunzel, alongside other Disney Princesses, appeared in the film Ralph Breaks the Internet, as was announced at the 2017 D23 Expo.

Merchandise

Rapunzel is the tenth member of the Disney Princess line-up, a marketing franchise aimed primarily at young girls that manufactures and releases products such as toys, video and audio recordings, clothing, and video games. The Walt Disney Company introduces characters into its Disney Princess line-up through coronation. Rapunzel's was held on October 2, 2011, at the Kensington Palace in London, England; the character became the franchise's first princess to have been computer-animated. However, the franchise uses a traditionally animated rendering of Rapunzel in most of its merchandise. Following her coronation, Rapunzel was recognized with her own page on the official Disney Princess website.

Disney Consumer Products has released several merchandise based on Tangled that features Rapunzel. Rapunzel appears as a playable character in an interactive adventure-themed video game based on the film, entitled Tangled: The Video Game. The game was released by Disney Interactive Studios on November 23, 2010, one day before the film's November 24 theatrical release, specifically for the Nintendo video game platforms Wii and DS, and follows the plot of the original film. Voice actress Mandy Moore reprises her role as Rapunzel in the video game. The character's likeness has also been adapted into a variety of doll products. Rapunzel was the first character created and released as part of the Disney Animator's Collection, a series of dolls depicting each of the eleven Disney Princesses as toddler. She was designed by Glen Keane, who served as her supervising animator on the original film.

Books

Mother Knows Best: A Tale of the Old Witch

Rapunzel appears in the fifth book of the Disney Villains series by author Serena Valentino.  She is stolen by Mother Gothel as a baby, but rather than being raised by Gothel, who is obsessed with the preservation of her two sisters, she is raised by Mrs. Tiddlebottom and Mrs. Lovelace, the housekeeper and nanny.  On her eight birthday, the Odd Sisters come and assist Gothel in attempting to use Rapunzel's hair to raise her sisters from the dead.  When Mrs. Lovelace finds them, the ceremony is broken.  Rapunzel is put to sleep and remains asleep in the tower for a decade.  When the Odd Sisters' spell breaks, she awakes and events follow the path of the film, with her meeting Flynn and going off on her adventures.  When Flynn is stabbed and dies after cutting her hair, Circe uses Rapunzel's tears to resurrect Flynn. The two are later married with Circe and Snow White attending their wedding.

Theme parks

Rapunzel currently makes regular appearances at various Walt Disney Parks and Resorts sites, locations and attractions. In anticipation of the film's theatrical release, several Tangled-based attractions were constructed at various Disney Parks locations in both California and Florida, United States. These include a life-sized replica of Rapunzel's tower, located in Fantasyland.

As part of photographer Annie Leibovitz's Disney Dream Portrait Series that she has been commissioning for Walt Disney Parks and Resorts since 2007, The Walt Disney Company hired American country singer-songwriter Taylor Swift to be featured as the model for Rapunzel. In a detailed description of the piece, Us Weekly wrote, "The stunning image — captioned 'Where a world of adventure awaits' — shows the 23-year-old Grammy winner perched on the window ledge of a moss-covered stone tower. A pink petticoat peeks out from under her purple gown as she stares wistfully into the distance, her long golden tresses flowing regally in the wind." Swift told On The Red Carpet that she was honored.

Reception

Critical response
Critics were generally positive in their opinions of Rapunzel. The St. Paul Pioneer Press' Chris Hewitt described the character as "no damsel in distress", while Sara Vizcarrondo of Boxoffice described the character as "a spunky heroine who could infiltrate the heavily guarded princess canon." Stephen Whitty of The Star-Ledger dubbed Rapunzel "a fairly capable young woman". Bruce Diones of The New Yorker wrote that Rapunzel has "a sharp wit and intelligent concerns", while Claudia Puig of USA Today opined, "Rapunzel is ... believable in her teenage histrionics". Calling the character a "delight", The Austin Chronicle's Marjorie Baumgarten wrote, "Rapunzel is a spunky gal, capable of defending herself". Sandie Angulo Chen of Common Sense Media wrote that Rapunzel is a "guileless, strong, and beautiful" character who is "so breathtakingly good that you can't help but weep with her when she thinks all hope is lost." The Milwaukee Journal Sentinel's Cathy Jakicic described Rapunzel as a "scrappy, self-reliant" heroine who "can rescue herself". The Scotsman commented, "the film doesn't ... turn [Rapunzel] into a simpering damsel in distress." Describing the character as "innocent but (inevitably) feisty", Empire's Helen O'Hara enjoyed the fact that both Rapunzel and Flynn are given "decent character development" while "bas[ing] their growing love story on more than a single longing glance." Similarly, the Mountain Xpress praised Rapunzel and Flynn's relationship, writing, "what works best is the interplay between the two leads ... these animated characters are frankly more believable and charismatic than the human ones in ... Love and Other Drugs." Todd Hertz of Christianity Today called Rapunzel "fun, dynamic, and wondrous".

Jim Schembri of The Age gave the character a very detailed, positive review, writing:

The character was not void of criticism. Although Richard Corliss of Time thoroughly enjoyed the film, he felt that too much emphasis was placed on Flynn Rider and not enough on Rapunzel. Corliss questioned the future of Disney's animated heroines, writing, "For 60 years ... girls were the focal characters who could be expected to come of age, triumph over adversity and, in general, man up," and accused various film studios of "abolish[ing] female-centered stories." Variety's Justin Chang described Rapunzel as a "bland, plastic" heroine, likening her to a Barbie doll. Similarly, Tom Huddleston of Time Out described Rapunzel as "bland". James Berardinelli of ReelViews was fairly mixed in his review, writing, "although likeable and energetic, [Rapunzel] is not as memorable as Snow White, Ariel, or Belle." Keith Uhlich of Time Out described the character as "synthetic". He wrote, "you never feel like you're watching a girl on the empowering cusp of adulthood so much as a selection of attitudes compiled through demographic study." The Independent's Anthony Quinn panned the character, describing her as "bland and Valley Girlish". Joe Williams of the St. Louis Post-Dispatch opined, "when the big-eyed heroine tries to tug at our heartstrings and Flynn turns into Prince Charming, the too-familiar hero-and-damsel motif feels like a fashion faux-pas." Similarly, the SouthtownStar's Jake Coyle wrote, "Both Rapunzel and Flynn too much resemble Barbie and Ken, lacking both superficial and emotional individuality." Jen Yamato of Movies.com criticized Disney for "failing to give Rapunzel a backbone and retreading ground so familiar you can fall asleep for ten minutes and still know exactly what happened".

As the tenth Disney Princess, several critics have drawn comparisons between Rapunzel and preceding Disney Princesses and animated heroines, the most frequent and prominent of whom remains Ariel from The Little Mermaid (1989). The Daily News'  Joe Neumaier likened Rapunzel's independence to that of Belle from Beauty and the Beast (1991), writing, "thoroughly modern Rapunzel does most of the saving". Jonathan Crocker of Total Film noted similarities between Rapunzel and Ariel, describing Rapunzel as "A strong-willed heroine longing to see outside." Mike Scott of The Times-Picayune commented on Rapunzel's innocence, describing it as "reminiscent of Amy Adams' flighty Giselle from ... Enchanted." LoveFilm's Tom Charity commented on the character's independence, likening Rapunzel's spirited personality to those of both Ariel from The Little Mermaid (1989) and the title character of Mulan (1998). Charity also labeled Rapunzel "another addition to the more recent Disney tradition of emancipated heroines".

Accolades and recognition
CNN's Stephanie Goldberg included Rapunzel in her article "Brave's Merida and other animated heroines", a list that recognized some of Disney's most heroic and independent heroines who have appeared in animated films. Goldberg jokingly wrote, "So what if ... Rapunzel defends herself with a frying pan and holds prisoners captive with her long, magical hair?" Sonia Saraiya of Nerve ranked Rapunzel fourth in her article "Ranked: Disney Princesses From Least To Most Feminist". Comparing the character's spirited personality to that of preceding Disney Princesses Ariel and Jasmine from Aladdin (1992), Saraiya described Rapunzel as "badass," despite the fact that "her naivete sometimes gets in the way of her progressivism." Saraiya continued, "[Rapunzel] also recognizes the unfairness of her plight and finds a way out of it, outwitting her 'mother,' who is in fact her kidnapper, to venture to the outside world." Tala Dayrit of Female Network included Rapunzel in her article "30 Fierce and Fun Female Cartoon Characters", writing that, unlike her original fairy tale counterpart, "She's not the helpless damsel locked in a tower awaiting an unknown fate, but a strong woman capable of defending herself in a fight."

In the film, Rapunzel performs the song "I See the Light" as a duet with Flynn Rider. The song received an Academy Award nomination for Best Original Song at the 83rd Academy Awards in 2011. Voice actress Mandy Moore performed the song live at the ceremony with co-star Zachary Levi, who provided the voice Flynn in the film. The song did, however, garner the Grammy Award for Best Song Written for Visual Media at the 54th ceremony in 2012.

References

External links

Official page
Rapunzel at Disney Princess

Film characters introduced in 2010
Fictional characters with healing abilities
Fictional painters
Disney Princess characters
Tangled characters
Fictional bibliophiles
Animated characters introduced in 2010